Wodefold is an English surname. Notable people with the surname include:

Giles Wodefold ( 1441–1449), MP for Lewes
Robert Wodefold ( 1446–1447), MP for Lewes

English-language surnames